Verena Schweers (born 22 May 1989) is a German retired footballer. She played as a defender.

She announced her retirement on 31 July 2020.

Career

Club
Schweers began her career at SC Kappel in 2000. She moved to  SC Freiburg in 2004, where she initially played in the club's youth and second team. For the 2006–07 season, she joined Freiburg's Bundesliga squad and made her first division debut. After seven years at the club, Schweers transferred to VfL Wolfsburg in 2010–11 season. In the 2012–13 season, she won the German League, the German Cup, and the Champion's League with Wolfsburg. In 2014, she won the German League and the Champions League again and in 2015 the German Cup. Schweers transferred to Bayern Munich in the 2016–2017 season, where she signed a two-year contract that will last until 30 June 2018.

International
At junior level, Schweers represented Germany at the 2008 FIFA U-20 Women's World Cup, reaching third-place. She made her debut for the German senior national team in October 2010 in a friendly match against Australia. Schweers was called up for Germany's 2011 FIFA Women's World Cup squad.

International goals
Scores and results list Germany's goal tally first:

Source:

Honours

Domestic
Bundesliga: Winner 2012–13, 2013–14
DFB-Pokal: Winner 2012–13, 2014–15, 2015–16

International
FIFA U-20 Women's World Cup: Third-place 2008
UEFA Women's Champions League:  Winner 2012–13, 2013–14

References

External links

1989 births
Living people
People from Ettenheim
Sportspeople from Freiburg (region)
German women's footballers
Footballers from Baden-Württemberg
SC Freiburg (women) players
VfL Wolfsburg (women) players
2011 FIFA Women's World Cup players
FC Bayern Munich (women) players
Germany women's international footballers
Women's association football defenders
2019 FIFA Women's World Cup players
Frauen-Bundesliga players